The M72 LAW (light anti-tank weapon, also referred to as the light anti-armor weapon or LAW as well as LAWS: light anti-armor weapons system) is a portable one-shot  unguided anti-tank weapon. The solid rocket propulsion unit was developed in the newly-formed Rohm and Haas research laboratory at Redstone Arsenal in 1959, and the full system was designed by Paul V. Choate, Charles B. Weeks, Frank A. Spinale, et al. at the Hesse-Eastern Division of Norris Thermador. American production of the weapon began by Hesse-Eastern in 1963, and was terminated by 1983; currently it is produced by Nammo Raufoss AS in Norway and their subsidiary, Nammo Talley, Inc. in Arizona.

In early 1963, the M72 LAW was adopted by the U.S. Army and U.S. Marine Corps as their primary individual infantry anti-tank weapon, replacing the M31 HEAT rifle grenade and the M20A1 "super bazooka" in the U.S. Army. It was subsequently adopted by the U.S. Air Force to serve in an anti-emplacement and anti-armor role in airbase defense.

In the early 1980s, the M72 was slated to be replaced by the FGR-17 Viper.  However, the Viper program was canceled by Congress and the M136 AT4 was adopted instead. At that time, its nearest equivalents were the Swedish Pskott m/68 (Miniman) and the French SARPAC.

Background

The increased importance of tanks and other armored vehicles in World War II caused a need for portable infantry weapons to deal with them. The first to be used (with limited success) were Molotov cocktails, flamethrowers, satchel charges, jury-rigged landmines, and specially designed magnetic hollow charges. All of these had to be used within a few meters of the target, which was difficult and dangerous.

The U.S. Army introduced the bazooka, the first rocket-propelled grenade launcher. Despite early problems, it was a success and was copied by other countries.

However, the bazooka had its drawbacks. Large and easily damaged, it required a well-trained two-man crew. Germany developed a one-man alternative, the Panzerfaust, having single-shot launchers that were cheap and requiring no special training. As a result, they were regularly issued to Volkssturm home guard regiments. They were very efficient against tanks during the last days of World War II.

The M72 LAW is a combination of the two World War II weapons. The basic principle is a miniaturized bazooka, while its light weight and cheapness rival the Panzerfaust.

Description

The weapon consists of a rocket within a launcher consisting of two tubes, one inside the other. While closed, the outer assembly serves as a watertight container for the rocket and the percussion-cap firing mechanism that activates the rocket. The outer tube contains the trigger, the arming handle, front and rear sights, and the rear cover. The inner tube contains the channel assembly, which houses the firing pin assembly, including the detent lever. When extended, the inner tube telescopes outward toward the rear, guided by the channel assembly, which rides in an alignment slot in the outer tube's trigger housing assembly. This causes the detent lever to move under the trigger assembly in the outer tube, both locking the inner tube in the extended position and cocking the weapon. Once armed, the weapon is no longer watertight, even if the launcher is collapsed into its original configuration.

When fired, the striker in the rear tube impacts a primer, which ignites a small amount of powder that "flashes" down a tube to the rear of the rocket and ignites the propellant in the rocket motor. The rocket propels the  warhead forward without significant recoil. As the warhead emerges from the launcher, six fins spring out from the base of the rocket tube, stabilizing the warhead's flight. The early LAW warhead, developed from the M31 HEAT rifle grenade warhead, uses a simple piezoelectric fuze system. On impact with the target, the front of the nose section is crushed, causing a microsecond electric current to be generated, which detonates a booster charge located in the base of the warhead, which sets off the main warhead charge. The force of the main charge forces the copper liner into a directional particle jet that, in relation to the size of the warhead, is capable of a massive penetration.

A unique mechanical set-back safety on the base of the detonator grounds the circuit until the missile has accelerated out of the tube. The acceleration causes the three disks in the safety mechanism to rotate 90° in succession, ungrounding the circuit; the circuit from the nose to the base of the detonator is then completed when the piezoelectric crystal is crushed on impact.

The Department of the Army previously rated the weapon as safe to fire from enclosure, but this rating was removed in 2010 after the introduction of the safer AT4 CS. However, some modern variants of the LAW are specifically designed with fire-from-enclosure (FFE) capability.

In late 2021, Nammo unveiled the concept of a multi-rotor unmanned aerial vehicle (UAV) equipped with a LAW.

Ammunition

M72 LAWs were issued as prepackaged rounds of ammunition. Improvements to the launcher and differences in the ammunition were differentiated by a single designation. The original M72 warhead penetrated  of armor.

A training variant of the M72 LAW, designated M190, also exists. This weapon is reloadable and uses the  M73 training rocket. A subcaliber training device that uses a special tracer cartridge also exists for the M72. A training variant used by the Finnish armed forces fires  tracer rounds.

The US Army tested other 66 mm rockets based on the M54 rocket motor used for the M72. The M74 TPA (thickened pyrophoric agent) had an incendiary warhead filled with TEA (triethylaluminum); this was used in the M202A1 FLASH (flame assault shoulder weapon) four-tube launcher. The XM96 RCR (riot control rocket) had a CS gas-filled warhead for crowd control and was also intended for use with the M202, though the rocket never entered service.

Service history

Australia
The M72 rocket has been in Australian service since the Vietnam War. Currently, the Australian Defence Force uses the M72A6 variant, known as the "light direct fire support weapon", as an anti-structure and secondary anti-armor weapon. The weapon is used by ordinary troops at the section (squad) level and complements the heavier  Carl Gustav recoilless rifle and Javelin missile, which are generally used by specialized fire support and anti-armor troops.

Canada
As of 21 February 2023, Canada has supplied 4500 M72s to Ukraine for use in the Russo-Ukrainian War. These are likely the M72A5-C1 designation.

Finland
The M72 LAW is used in the Finnish Army (some 70,000 pieces), where it is known under the designations 66 KES 75 (M72A2, no longer in service) and 66 KES 88 (M72A5). Due to its low penetration capability, it is used mostly against lightly-armored targets. The M72 is the most common anti-tank weapon in the Finnish Army. Finland has recently upgraded its stocks to the M72 EC LAW Mk.I version. It also fields the bunker-buster version that contains  of DPX-6 explosive, named M72 ASM RC, and locally designated 66 KES 12 RAK. The oldest version of the 66 KES 75 is now retired.

Norway
In late February 2022, the Norwegian government announced that it intended to donate "up to 2,000" M72 LAW units from their reserve stocks to Ukraine, in response to the Russian invasion. On March 30, 2022, the Norwegian Defence Ministry said that 2,000 more units will be sent to Ukraine.

Taiwan
The Republic of China Army (Taiwan) uses the M72 as a secondary anti-armor weapon. It is used primarily as a backup to the Javelin and M136 (AT4) anti-tank weapons. The weapon was later reverse-engineered into the "Type 1 66 mm anti-tank rocket" but is more-popularly nicknamed as the "Type 66 rocket" due to its caliber.

Turkey
The Turkish Army uses a locally built version by Makina ve Kimya Endustrisi Kurumu, called HAR-66 (Hafif Antitank Roketi, 'light antitank rocket'), which has the performance and characteristics of a mix of an M72A2 and an A3. Turkey also indigenously developed an anti-personnel warhead version of HAR-66 AP and called it "Eşek Arısı" ('wasp').

United Kingdom
The British Army had used the NAMMO M72 under the designation "rocket 66 mm HEAT L1A1" but it was replaced by the LAW 80 during the 1980s. It was used in action during the 1982 Falklands War, mainly to suppress Argentinian defensive positions at close range; however, it was also used against an assault amphibious vehicle during the initial invasion and was one of the weapons which damaged the warship  in the invasion of South Georgia. The M72 rocket was reintroduced into British service under the Urgent Operational Requirement program, with the M72A9 variant being designated the light anti-structure munition (LASM).

United States

During the Vietnam and post-Vietnam periods, all issued LAWs were recalled after instances of the warhead exploding in flight, sometimes injuring the operator. After safety improvements, part of the training and firing drills included the requirement to ensure that the words "w/coupler" were included in the text description stenciled on the launcher, which indicated that the launcher had the required safety modifications.

With the failure of the M72's intended replacement, the Viper, in late 1982 Congress ordered the US Army to test off-the-shelf light antitank weapons and report back by the end of 1983. In partnership with Raufoss AS, Talley Defense offered the M72E5, which offered increased range, penetration and better sights; this was tested along with five other light anti-armor weapons in 1983. Despite the improvements that the M72E5 offered, the AT4 was chosen to replace the M72.

Although generally thought of as a Vietnam War–era weapon that has been superseded by the more-powerful AT4, the M72 LAW found new popularity in the operations by the U.S. Army, the U.S. Marine Corps, and Canadian Army in Iraq and Afghanistan. The lower cost and lighter weight of the LAW, combined with a scarcity of modern heavy armored targets and the need for an individual assault weapon versus an individual anti-armor weapon, made it ideal for the type of urban combat seen in Iraq and mountain warfare seen in Afghanistan. In addition, a soldier can carry two LAWs on a mission as opposed to a single AT4.

The U.S. Marine Corps Systems Command at Quantico, Virginia, placed a $15.5-million fixed contract order with Talley Defense for 7,750 M72A7s, with delivery to be completed in April 2011. The M72A7 LAW is an improvement on previous versions, including an improved rocket motor for a higher velocity to accurately engage targets past , an insensitive munitions warhead to reduce the likelihood of an accidental explosion, and a Picatinny rail to mount laser pointers and night sights. The LAW was useful in Afghanistan as a small and light rocket system for use against short- and medium-range targets by foot patrols in the difficult terrain and high elevations of the country. The U.S. military was still purchasing LAW rockets as of January 2015. In 2018 it was reported that an upgrade for the LAW was being developed that would improve the fire control system as well as largely eliminate the weapon's back blast, allowing the weapon to be used more safely from within a confined space.

Vietnam
Several M72A1 and M72A2 LAWs captured during the Vietnam War have been put into service with the chemical force of the Vietnam People's Army. The launchers are upgraded to be able to fire multiple times and are armed with M74 incendiary rounds.

Variants

Variants

Armor penetration

Specifications (M72A2 and M72A3)

Launcher
 Length:
 Extended: less than 
 Closed: 
 Weight:
 Complete M72A2: 
 Complete M72A3: 
 Firing mechanism: percussion.
 Front sight: reticle graduated in 25 m range increments
 Rear sight: peep sight adjusts automatically to temperature change

Rocket
 Caliber: 
 Length: 
 Weight: 
 Muzzle velocity: 
 Minimum range (combat): 
 Minimum arming range: 
 Maximum range: 
 Penetration:

Maximum effective ranges
 Stationary target: 
 Moving target: 
 Beyond these ranges there is less than a 50% chance of hitting the target.

Operators

Current operators
 : M72A3 variant.
 : M72A6 variant.
 
 
 :M72A2 variant used by navy
  M72A5 variant, labeled as M72A5-C1
 : M72A3 variant. Used by the Chilean Army and the Chilean Marine Corps. New variant used by the latter force reported in 2018.
 : M72A7 variant, since 2018 M72 EC
 
 
 : M72A5 variant since 2007
 
 
 
 
 
 :
 : The weapon was shown during new military equipment presentation recently which were sent with Turkey's official representative to hand them Kyrgyz officials.
 
 : Lithuanian National Defence Volunteer Forces
 : First seen in September 2018
 
 
 
 
 
 : On July 7, 2022, Deputy Prime Minister and Minister of National Defense Mariusz Błaszczak announced the delivery of several thousand M72 EC MK1s.
 
 
 
 : M72A3 variant.
 
 
 
 
 : delivered to Ukraine by Canadian, Danish and Norwegian Armed Forces (and possibly several others), as part of the military aid during the 2022 Russian Invasion.
 : Used by the British Army from the 1970s to the early 1990s. The M72A9 variant was reintroduced into service for the Afghanistan war. due to its light weight, lower cost and greater portability.

Former users
  FNLA
 : launchers captured and used in Sino-Vietnamese War and Sino-Vietnamese conflicts, replaced by the PF-89, PF-98 and DZJ-08 anti-tank grenade launcher.

See also
 Shoulder-launched Multipurpose Assault Weapon
 List of U.S. Army Rocket Launchers By Model Number

Similar weapons
 C90-CR (M3)
 M80 rocket launcher
 Panzerfaust 3
 RPG-18 / RPG-22 / RPG-26
 RPG-76

Notes

References

External links

 FAS
 Gary's U.S. Infantry Weapons Reference Guide
 Modern Firearms
 Military-Today
 Military Factory
 Designation-Systems
 Article on the reintroduction of the LAW in Iraq by the USMC
 Canadian Military Page On the M72
 Patent for sights of M72 patented by Paul V. Choate of Milton, MA.
 Patented by Paul V. Choate of Milton, MA.
 1960s US Army M72 Training film

Anti-tank rockets of the United States
Anti-tank rockets
Military equipment introduced in the 1960s